is a Japanese sailor. He competed in the Finn event at the 1988 Summer Olympics.

References

1956 births
Living people
Japanese male sailors (sport)
Olympic sailors of Japan
Sailors at the 1988 Summer Olympics – Finn
Place of birth missing (living people)